Cory Nelms (born February 27, 1988) is a former American football cornerback who played in the National Football League (NFL). He played college football at the University of Miami and attended Neptune High School in Neptune Township, New Jersey. He was a member of the San Francisco 49ers and Oakland Raiders.

Early years
Nelms participated in football and track and field for the Neptune High School Scarlet Fliers.
On the football field, Nelms was a 2005 PrepStar Preseason All-American and earned All-Region honors, while in track he won six NJSIAA state championships. He was also the runner-up in the 60m hurdles at the 2005 National Scholastic Indoor Championships and earned the 2006 National Scholastic Indoor Championship in the 60m hurdles. Nelms was also a member of the National Honor Society.

College career
Nelms played for the Miami Hurricanes from 2007 to 2010. He was also a member of the Hurricanes' track and field team.
A two-sport standout for the Hurricanes, Nelms was a member of the track team and football team while at Miami. An All-ACC performer on the track, Nelms won the 2009 ACC Indoor Championship in the 60m hurdles and claimed the 2010 ACC Outdoor title in the 110m hurdles. He holds the school record in the 400m hurdles (50.75) and is a member of the quartet that ran a UM record time of 39.57 seconds in the  relay.

Professional career

San Francisco 49ers
Nelms signed with the San Francisco 49ers of the NFL on July 27, 2011 after going undrafted in the 2011 NFL Draft. He was released by the 49ers on September 3 and signed to the team's practice squad on September 4, 2011. He was signed to a futures contract by the 49ers on January 24, 2012. Nelms was released by the 49ers on August 27, 2012.

Oakland Raiders
On November 19, 2012, Nelms was signed to the practice squad of the Oakland Raiders of the NFL. He was promoted to the active roster on December 28, 2012. He appeared in one game for the Raiders on December 30, 2012 against the San Diego Chargers. He was released by the Raiders on August 25, 2013.

References

External links
Just Sports Stats
NFL Draft Scout

Living people
1988 births
American football cornerbacks
African-American players of American football
Miami Hurricanes football players
San Francisco 49ers players
Oakland Raiders players
Players of American football from New Jersey
Neptune High School alumni
People from Neptune Township, New Jersey
Sportspeople from Monmouth County, New Jersey
21st-century African-American sportspeople
20th-century African-American people